Guillaume Édouard Marie Dubufe (16 May 1853, Paris – 25 May 1909, at sea, near Buenos Aires) was a French painter, decorator and illustrator.

Biography 
His father Édouard was a painter and his mother Juliette Dubufe (the daughter of composer Pierre-Joseph-Guillaume Zimmermann) was a sculptor. His grandfather, Claude, was also a painter and Charles Gounod was his uncle. Sadly, his mother died while giving birth to his sister Hortense when he was only two.

As might be expected, he received his first art lessons from his father, then pursued his studies at the École des Beaux-Arts under Alexis-Joseph Mazerolle. His first major commission involved decorating the ceiling of the foyer at the Comédie-Française

When not staying at their mansion in Paris, his family (he had five children) stayed at their villa in Anacapri on the Isle of Capri, where he painted scenes of his home that would be exhibited in 1906 at the Georges Petit Gallery. From 1888 to 1890, he produced a series of paintings featuring the Virgin Mary. During the 1890s, he decorated the ceilings of the Lobau Gallery at the Hôtel de Ville, the banquet hall at the Élysée Palace and the library at the Sorbonne. In 1896, he designed and produced the décor for the "Salon National des Beaux-Arts". Four years later, he was one of several artists who provided decorations for Le Train Bleu, a famous restaurant near the Gare de Lyon. From 1906 to 1909, he and Édouard Rosset-Granger decorated the Town Hall of Saint-Mandé. He also illustrated several works by the French dramatist Émile Augier.

He died at sea. His friend, the sculptor Albert Bartholomé provided the bas-relief for his memorial at Père Lachaise cemetery. In 1921, his mansion in Paris was acquired by Marie Henner, who turned it into a museum. It was donated to the French government in 1926, and is now known as the Musée national Jean-Jacques Henner.

His daughter , also became a painter.

Writings
 La Valeur de l'Art, in the series, "Bibliothèque de philosophie scientifique", éditions E. Flammarion, 1908.

References

Further reading
 Editorial staff, "La Mort de M. Guillaume Dubufe" in La Vie Parisienne (1909)
 Armand Guérinet, Exposition rétrospective de l'oeuvre de Guillaume Dubufe: catalog, Société nationale des beaux-arts, Librairie d'art décoratif (1910)
 Louise Gaggini et al., Le Train Bleu, Edition Presse Lois Unis Service, Paris (1990)

External links

 Arcadja Auctions: More works by Dubufe.
 

1853 births
1909 deaths
Painters from Paris
People who died at sea
French portrait painters
19th-century French painters
20th-century French painters
20th-century French male artists
19th-century French illustrators
20th-century French illustrators
École des Beaux-Arts alumni
French male painters
Members of the Ligue de la patrie française
Burials at Père Lachaise Cemetery
19th-century French male artists